SZSE 100 Index are indice of Shenzhen Stock Exchange. It consists of SZSE 100 Price Index and SZSE 100 Return Index, using the same constituents but different methodology.

Despite it was intended as the blue-chip index of Shenzhen Stock Exchange, comparing to counterpart SSE 50 Index, it had a smaller total free-float adjusted market capitalization of the constituents as well as smaller average free-float adjusted market capitalization per constituent. They have difference composition in constituents. , 23.54% of the constituents of SZSE 100 Index were financial services companies (including bank and insurance), 21.49% were from consumer discretionary industry and 20.54% were from information technology industry.

Constituents
Weighting updated to 31 December 2021

Footnotes

References
general
 
specific

Chinese stock market indices
Shenzhen Stock Exchange
Lists of companies of China